The Realm (also known as The Candidate) is a 2018 Spanish-French thriller film directed by Rodrigo Sorogoyen. At the 33rd Goya Awards, the film won seven awards, including Best Director, Best Actor (Antonio de la Torre), and Best Original Screenplay.

Plot
Without higher education, Manuel has worked his way up in local politics to the point where he may be the next head of the regional council. As Spain has been developing rapidly, attracting foreign investors and substantial funds from the European Union, local politicians have been systematically enriching themselves, some buying ostentatious yachts while others hide their cash in Andorra. The party bosses in Madrid decide that the corruption in the region must be rooted out before the party is discredited nationally. 

After refusing to disappear abroad quietly, Manuel is made one of the fall guys, arrested and charged. On bail awaiting trial, he starts a personal campaign to expose the big names who are still free and promises Amaia, a leading TV journalist, that he will get her evidence on the real criminals. Learning that one of the kingpins is not at his villa in Andorra, he goes there at night and persuades the man's daughter to let him in, saying he has to collect vital documents for her father. Finding four handwritten notebooks that mention everybody in the racket, himself included, he races back towards Madrid in the dark. 

Shadowed by a vehicle without lights that follows his taillights, he also switches off his lights off and then crashes, ending upside down in a field. When the shadower comes to look for him, he knocks him out and, taking the man's keys, drives his assailant's car on to Madrid. Amaia puts him straight on to her live show, with his notebooks, but has no intention of accusing anybody without adequate proof or of prejudicing future trials. Instead of exploring his allegations, she attacks him for being a self-seeking cog in a vicious machine who is now trying to save his skin by informing on others. His crusade for the truth collapsing, for once he is left speechless.

Cast

Production 
The film was produced by Tornasol, Trianera PC AIE, Atresmedia Cine and Bowfinger alongside Le Pacte and Mondex & Cie with the participation of Atresmedia and Movistar+.

Shooting primarily took place in Valencia.

Release 
It was screened in the Contemporary World Cinema section at the 2018 Toronto International Film Festival.

Distributed by Warner Bros, it was theatrically released in Spain on 28 September 2018.

Awards and nominations

|-
| rowspan = "29" align = "center" | 2019
| rowspan = "2" | 24th Forqué Awards || colspan = "2" | Best Film ||  || rowspan = "2" | 
|-
| Best Actor
| Antonio de la Torre
| 
|-
| rowspan = 10 | 6th Feroz Awards
| colspan = 2 | Best Drama Film
| 
| align = "center" rowspan = "10" | 
|-
| Best Actor in a Film
| Antonio de la Torre
| 
|-
| Best Supporting Actress in a Film
| Ana Wagener
| 
|-
| rowspan = "2" | Best Supporting Actor in a Film
| Luis Zahera
| 
|-
| José María Pou
| 
|-
| Best Film Trailer
| 
| 
|-
| Best Film Poster
| 
| 
|-
| Best Screenplay
| Isabel Peña, Rodrigo Sorogoyen
| 
|-
| Best Original Score
| Olivier Arson
| 
|-
| Best Director
| Rodrigo Sorogoyen
| 
|-
| rowspan=  13 | 33rd Goya Awards
| colspan = 2 | Best Film
| 
| align = "center" rowspan = "13" | 
|-
| Best Director
| Rodrigo Sorogoyen
| 
|-
| Best Actor
| Antonio de la Torre
| 
|-
| Best Supporting Actress
| Ana Wagener
| 
|-
| Best Supporting Actor
| Luis Zahera
| 
|-
| Best New Actor
| Francisco Reyes
| 
|-
| Best Original Score
| 
| 
|-
| Best Production Supervision
| 
| 
|-
| Best Cinematography
| 
| 
|-
| Best Editing
| 
| 
|-
| Best Original Screenplay
| Isabel Peña, Rodrigo Sorogoyen
| 
|-
| Best Sound
| 
| 
|-
| Best Special Effects
| 
| 
|-
| rowspan = "4" | 28th Actors and Actresses Union Awards || Best Film Actor in a Leading Role || Antonio de la Torre ||  || rowspan = "4" | 
|-
| Best Film Actress in a Secondary Role || Ana Wagener || 
|-
| Best Film Actor in a Secondary Role || Luis Zahera || 
|-
| Best Film Actress in a Minor Role || Sonia Almarcha || 
|}

See also 
 List of Spanish films of 2018

References

External links
 

2018 films
2018 thriller films
Spanish thriller films
2010s Spanish-language films
Warner Bros. films
Films about politicians
2010s political thriller films
Spanish political thriller films
Films shot in Valencia
Tornasol Films films
Atresmedia Cine films
Bowfinger International Pictures films
2010s Spanish films